A calligraphus (pl. ) was an ancient copyist or scrivener, who transcribed correctly and in its entirety what the notaries had taken down in notes, or minutes—duties similar to the modern work of engrossing.

These notes being understood by few, were copied exactly by people with good handwriting; these were called , a name often found in ancient writings.

References 

Ancient Roman titles
Historical legal occupations